William Robinson (8 August 1934 – 5 December 2005) was an English professional rugby league footballer who played in the 1950s and 1960s.

Background
Bill Robinson was born in Wigan, Lancashire, England, and he died aged 71 in Royal Albert Edward Infirmary, Wigan, Greater Manchester, England.

Playing career

International honours
Bill Robinson won caps for Great Britain while at Leigh in the 42-4 victory over France at Central Park, Wigan on Wednesday 3 April 1963, and the 12-50 defeat by Australia at Station Road, Swinton on Saturday 9 November 1963.

County Cup Final appearances
Bill Robinson played in Leigh's 26–9 victory over Widnes in the 1955 Lancashire County Cup Final during the 1955–56 season at Central Park, Wigan on Saturday 15 October 1955, and played left-, i.e. number 8, in Leigh's 4-15 defeat by St. Helens in the 1963 Lancashire County Cup Final during the 1963–64 season at Knowsley Road, St. Helens on Saturday 26 October 1963.

References

External links
!Great Britain Statistics at englandrl.co.uk (statistics currently missing due to not having appeared for both Great Britain, and England)

1934 births
2005 deaths
English rugby league players
Great Britain national rugby league team players
Leigh Leopards captains
Leigh Leopards players
Parramatta Eels players
Rugby league players from Wigan
Rugby league props